Joanna Fabisiak (born 7 July 1950 in Warsaw) is a Polish politician. She was elected to the Sejm on 25 September 2005, getting 6693 votes in 19 Warsaw district as a candidate from the Civic Platform list.

She was also a member of Sejm 1997-2001.

See also
Members of Polish Sejm 2005-2007

External links
Joanna Fabisiak - parliamentary page - includes declarations of interest, voting record, and transcripts of speeches.

Women members of the Sejm of the Republic of Poland
Civic Platform politicians
1950 births
Living people
Politicians from Warsaw
20th-century Polish women politicians
21st-century Polish women politicians
Members of the Polish Sejm 1997–2001
Members of the Polish Sejm 2005–2007
Members of the Polish Sejm 2007–2011
Members of the Polish Sejm 2011–2015
Members of the Polish Sejm 2015–2019
Members of the Polish Sejm 2019–2023